Pahlmann is a surname. Notable people with the surname include:

 Ingrid Pahlmann (born 1957), German politician
 William Pahlmann (1900–1987), American interior designer

See also
 Pohlmann